Events in the year 1817 in Norway.

Incumbents
Monarch: Charles II

Events

 The Miss Schultz School is founded. It was the first school for girls in Bergen, the biggest city in Norway in 1817.

Arts and literature

Births
9 January – Jacob Jørgen Kastrup Sømme, businessperson, consul and politician (d.1893)
2 June – Vilhelm Frimann Christie Bøgh, archivist (d.1888)
23 July – Johan Christian Collett, politician (d.1895)
8 August - Eilert Sundt, sociologist (d.1875)
9 September – Johan Collett Falsen, jurist and politician (d.1879)
14 October – Marcus Thrane, author, journalist, and the leader of the first labour movement in Norway (d.1890)
4 December – Hans Jensen, businessperson (d.1888)

Full date unknown
Anders Bull, politician and Minister (d.1906)
Magnus Feilberg, bookseller and publisher (d.1899)
Ole Larsen Hammerstad, politician (d.1873)
Adolph Frederik Munthe, politician and Minister (d.1884)
Hilmar Martinus Strøm, politician
Niels Petersen Vogt, politician and Minister (d.1894)
Johannes Tørrissen Worum, politician

Deaths
26 May - Peter Holm,  government official and topographical writer (b.1733)
29 July - Johan Lausen Bull, jurist and politician (b.1751)
22 December - Peder Jørgen Cloumann, bailiff and representative at the Norwegian Constituent Assembly (b.1747)

See also